The 1894 Orange Athletic Club football team was an American football team that represented the Orange Athletic Club in the American Football Union (AFU) during the 1894 college football season. The team played its home games at the Orange Oval in East Orange, New Jersey, compiled a 4–5–1 record (1–0 against AFU opponents), and won the AFU championship. Coyne was the team captain.

Schedule

References

Orange Athletic Club
Orange Athletic Club football seasons
Orange Athletic Club football